Carlos Alberto Torres Torres (born 18 November 1975) is a Mexican politician from the National Action Party. From 2006 to 2009, he served as Deputy of the LX Legislature of the Mexican Congress representing Baja California.

References

1975 births
Living people
Politicians from Baja California
National Action Party (Mexico) politicians
21st-century Mexican politicians
Autonomous University of Baja California alumni
Academic staff of the Autonomous University of Baja California
Deputies of the LX Legislature of Mexico
Members of the Chamber of Deputies (Mexico) for Baja California